Galium perralderii is a species of flowering plant, native to Algeria, in the family Rubiaceae.

This plant was first described in 1862 by Ernest Cosson.
The specific epithet, perralderii, honours Cosson's friend and fellow botanist, Henri-René Le Tourneux de la Perraudière (1831-1861).

References

External links

 

perralderii
Flora of Algeria
Plants described in 1862
Taxa named by Ernest Cosson